Type 42 may refer to:
 Bristol Type 42 Grampus II, British prototype biplane passenger aircraft
 Peugeot Type 42, motor vehicle by the French auto-maker Peugeot
 Type 42 destroyer, light guided missile destroyers used by the Royal Navy and the Argentine Navy
 Type 42, a font format, see PostScript fonts#Type 42